Il Sogno is the 20th studio album by Elvis Costello, released in 2004 by Deutsche Grammophon. It is performed by the London Symphony Orchestra conducted by Michael Tilson Thomas, recorded at Abbey Road Studios in London. It peaked at No. 1 on the Billboard Classical Music albums chart.

Content
It is a ballet score for orchestra commissioned by the Aterballetto Dance Company of Reggio Emilia in 2000. The ballet itself used A Midsummer Night's Dream by William Shakespeare for its subject material. The premiere performance took place on 31 October 2000, at the Teatro Comunale di Bologna.

An initial recording of the work was made by the house orchestra at the Teatro Comunale to accommodate venues that had no orchestra to present the score live. The present recording was taped over four days in April 2002, with the composer in attendance. It was released the same day as The Delivery Man.

An abridged version of this album was included as a bonus disc with the initial release of Costello's 2005 album My Flame Burns Blue.  This abridged version omits tracks 5, 6, 7, 11, 21 and 22.

Track listing

Act One

Act Two

Act Three

Featured personnel
 Michael Tilson Thomas – conductor
 John Harle – saxophone
 Chris Laurence – double bass
 Peter Erskine – percussion

Charts

References

External links
 

Elvis Costello albums
2004 classical albums
Ballet music
Deutsche Grammophon albums